Shayne Philpott (born 21 September 1965) is a former New Zealand rugby union player. A utility back, Philpott represented Canterbury at a provincial level, and was a member of the New Zealand national side, the All Blacks, between 1988 and 1991. He played 14 matches for the All Blacks including two internationals.

Philpott attended Burnside High School in Christchurch from 1979 to 1983.

References

1965 births
Living people
Rugby union players from Christchurch
People educated at Burnside High School
New Zealand rugby union players
New Zealand international rugby union players
Canterbury rugby union players
Rugby union fullbacks
Rugby union wings
Rugby union centres
Rugby union fly-halves